The IBM MT/ST (Magnetic Tape/Selectric Typewriter, and known in Europe as MT72) was a model of the IBM Selectric typewriter, built into its own desk, integrated with magnetic tape recording and playback facilities, located in an attached enclosure, with controls and a bank of relays. It was released by IBM in 1964. It recorded text typed on 1/2" magnetic tape, approximately 25 kilobytes per tape cassette, and allowed editing and re-recording during playback. It was the first system marketed as a word processor. Most models had two tape drives, which greatly facilitated revision and enabled features such as mail merge. An add-on module added a third tape station, to record the combined output of playback from the two stations.

The MT/ST automated word wrap, but it had no screen, automated hyphenation (soft hyphens were available), or concept of the page; pages had to be divided and numbered by the human operator during playback. Instruction manuals taught the operator the importance of listening to the sounds of the machine during playback. The backspace key backed up the tape so a character could be recorded over; there was also a true backspace code, which allowed overstruck characters, like á. Insertion capabilities were limited: one could insert while copying from one tape station to the other; on a single tape one null character per line was reserved for insertions. A "switch code" instructed the playback to switch to the other tape drive. In a cumbersome way, points on the tape could be marked and jumped to.

The MT/ST was not electronic; it implemented its functions through a bank of electromechanical relays.

In 1967 IBM hired Jim Henson to produce and direct a short film on the MT/ST; the film, called Paperwork Explosion, was scored by Raymond Scott.

The first novel to be written on a word processor, Len Deighton's 1970 Second World War historical novel Bomber, about an RAF Bomber Command raid over Germany, was written on  the MT/ST.

The MT/ST was also used as a data entry device for early issues of the RILM Abstracts scholarly publication at the City University of New York Graduate Center. Cartridges created on the MT/ST were read by an IBM 2495 Tape Cartridge Reader onto an IBM 360 mainframe for further processing before being sent to be printed.

The MT/ST became obsolete in the 1970s, when it was displaced by floppy disk-based systems. IBM discontinued support in 1983.

MT/SC

In 1967 the Magnetic Tape Selectric Composer (MT/SC) appeared. It was an output device which played back tapes recorded and edited on the MT/ST. It was physically similar to the MT/ST, but its tape unit had only one tape reader. Built into the desk, instead of the Selectric typewriter, was an IBM Selectric Composer, previously an unautomated device. It used typeballs similar but not interchangeable with those of the Selectric, with three type sizes (10, 12, and 15 characters per inch), fractional interword spacing, bold, italic (but not bold italic), and a variety of serif and sans-serif typefaces, such as Bodoni, Univers, Times Roman, and the like. It produced fully justified, camera-ready output, but the manual version required that each line be typed twice, once to calculate the size of the precise interword spaces and a repeat typing to precisely insert them.

The MT/SC automated the Composer, and it printed at approximately the speed of the Selectric typewriter, automating the interword spaces and thus justifying the output. The MT/ST and MT/SC combination (two machines) put the rapid production of camera-ready copy, for the first time, within the budget of a small to medium-sized publisher. However, the need to stop the Composer twice whenever a typeface was changed or italic was used (once to change it and again to change it back), sometimes multiple times in the same sentence, could significantly slow down the procedure. The choice of element to be changed—which typeball would be installed—was manual and used information given to the operator but not encoded in the data stream. Like a typesetter, for example, the operator needed to know that titles are italicized.

See also
IBM Electromatic Table Printing Machine

References

External Links

Mt St
Word processors
Computer-related introductions in 1964
Products introduced in 1964
Discontinued products
Discontinued media formats